Abdul Aziz is an Indian politician and Member of the Assam Legislative Assembly.

Early life and family
Abdul Aziz was born between 1968 and 1969, into a Bengali Muslim family in India. His father was Abdul Latif of Kanishail. In 1988, he achieved his Higher Secondary School Certificate and later married Asma Begum.

Career
Abdul Aziz began his career as a businessman before also getting involved in politics. He was successful in the 2021 Assam Legislative Assembly elections in which he represented the All India United Democratic Front in the Badarpur constituency.

References

Assam politicians
Living people
People from Karimganj district
21st-century Bengalis
1969 births
Assam MLAs 2021–2026